Blessy is a commune in the Pas-de-Calais department in the Hauts-de-France region in northern France.

Geography

Population

Sights
 The church of St. Omer, dating from the fifteenth century.
 The remains of the chateau of Blessel.
 A limestone quarry.

See also
Communes of the Pas-de-Calais department

References

Communes of Pas-de-Calais